Vellaramkunnu is a village  from Thekkady, Kerala, India.

Economy
The majority of residents are farmers, growing crops such as cardamom, pepper, coffee and tea.

Education
St Marys HSS is the regional school.

History
The old name of this village was Moongithozhu as evident from the veterinary dispensary situated in this place, known as veterinary dispensary, Moongithozhu.

Suburbs
Vellaramkunnu serves as a hub for the nearby villages Pathumury, Dymock, Anakkuzhy, Chenkara, and Moonkilar.

References

Villages in Idukki district